A château is a manor house or a country house of gentry, usually French, with or without fortifications.

Château, The Chateau, or variants may also refer to:

Places
Château, Saône-et-Loire, a commune in France
 Chateau Tongariro or The Chateau, a New Zealand hotel and resort complex

United States
Chateau (Pittsburgh), a neighborhood in the city of Pittsburgh, PA
The Chateau (Denver, Colorado), a building on the National Register of Historic Places in Denver, Colorado
Chateau Theatre or The Chateau, a building in Rochester, Minnesota, listed on the NRHP
Oregon Caves Chateau or The Chateau, a historic hotel in Oregon Caves National Monument

Music
 Chateaux (band), a new wave of British heavy metal (NWOBHM) band
"Chateau" (Angus & Julia Stone song), a 2017 song
"Chateau" (Tokio Hotel song), a 2019 song by Tokio Hotel
"Chateau", a 2003 Rob Dougan song featured on The Matrix Reloaded: The Album
 "Chateau", a 2019 song by Jaden Smith on the album Erys

Other uses
Le Château, a clothing retailer
 Château fort or Castle, a type of fortified structure built during the Middle Ages
 Château style, a Revivalist architectural style
Château, a chocolate brand produced by August Storck KG for Aldi

See also

 
 
 
 Chatelaine (disambiguation)
 Chatelain (disambiguation)
 Chastel (disambiguation)
 Chatel (disambiguation)